The Microsoft Certified Application Specialist: Microsoft Office Word 2007 is a certification in the Microsoft Certified Applications Specialist (MCAS) series of Microsoft certifications.  77-601 is the Microsoft exam that leads to this certification on Microsoft Word 2007.  The test is 90 minutes in length and features questions using live demonstration, multiple choice, and order question.

External links
http://www.microsoft.com/learning/en/us/exam.aspx?ID=77-601&locale=en-us

Application Specialist: Microsoft Office Word 2007